California Riverside Ballet is a ballet company formerly headquartered in Riverside, California, United States, in Riverside's historic Aurea Vista Hotel, city landmark number 84.  The company was founded in 1969, and operates as a non-profit organization, with support from the city of Riverside, the County of Riverside, the Riverside Arts Council, The Press-Enterprise, and other charitable donations.  In addition to staging local ballet performances, the organization is known for its annual fundraiser, called Ghost Walk, that takes place prior to Halloween in Downtown Riverside. Today, the California Riverside Ballet hosts multiple events in downtown Riverside each year including Spirit Walk, the Nutcracker Tea and The Nutcracker.

California Riverside Ballet created The Academy Program in June 2013 to offer affordable and free ballet training to students in low income areas.

History 

1969 Founded in Riverside, CA. Split into two different ballet schools both in Riverside, Riverside Ballet Arts, under Glenda Carhart, and California Riverside Ballet.

References

External links

Ballet companies in the United States
Dance in California
Culture of Riverside, California
Organizations based in Riverside County, California
1969 establishments in California
Performing groups established in 1969